Peschanoozerka is a rural locality (a selo) in Peschanoozersky Selsoviet of Oktyabrsky District, Amur Oblast, Russia. The population was 462 as of 2018. There are 4 streets.

Geography 
Peschanoozerka is located 43 km west of Yekaterinoslavka (the district's administrative centre) by road. Varvarovka is the nearest rural locality.

References 

Rural localities in Oktyabrsky District, Amur Oblast